Copleston may refer to:

People
Edward Copleston (1776–1849), English churchman and academic 
Ernest Copleston (1855–1933), Anglican Bishop, brother of Reginald
Frederick Selwyn Copleston (1850–1935), civil servant in Burma; father of Frederick Charles
Frederick Charles Copleston (1907–1994), Jesuit priest, historian of philosophy
Geoffrey Copleston (1921–1999), British actor
John Copleston (fl. 1655), Sheriff of Devon
Reginald Copleston (1845–1925), Anglican Bishop in India, brother of Ernest

Places
Copplestone, Devon, England
Copleston High School

English-language surnames